Paramount Networks Americas (PNA) (formerly MTV Networks Latin America, Viacom International Media Networks The Americas, then ViacomCBS Networks Americas) is a subsidiary of Paramount Global. PNA's operational headquarters is located in Miami, Florida.

Channels 
The following channels are:

Latin America 
 MTV
 MTV Hits (operated by Paramount Networks EMEAA)
 MTV Live (operated by Paramount Networks EMEAA)
 MTV 00s (operated by Paramount Networks EMEAA)
 Nickelodeon
 Nick Jr.
 TeenNick
 NickMusic (operated by Paramount Media Networks)
 Comedy Central
 Paramount Network
 Telefe (based in Buenos Aires, Argentina)
 Chilevisión (based in Santiago, Chile)

Brazil 
 BET
 MTV
 MTV Hits (operated by Paramount Networks EMEAA)
 MTV Live (operated by Paramount Networks EMEAA)
 MTV 00s (operated by Paramount Networks EMEAA)
 Nickelodeon
 Nick Jr.
 NickMusic (operated by Paramount Media Networks)
 Comedy Central
 Paramount Network
 Telefe Internacional

Canada 
PNA also manages the Paramount brands in Canada, through joint-ventures or license agreements:
 MTV (owned by Bell Media)
 MTV2 (owned by Bell Media)
 Nickelodeon (owned by Corus Entertainment)
 CMT (owned 90% by Corus Entertainment, 10% by Paramount Networks Americas)

Former channels 
 MTV Jams (2002–2015)
 Nickelodeon GAS (1999–2009)
 VH1 Soul (1998–2015)
 VH1 (Latin America) (2004–2020)
 MTV Hits (Latin America) (2008–2020)
 MTVNHD (2008–2011)
 MTV Dance (2017–2020)
 Nicktoons (Latin America) (2013–2020)
 VH1 (Brazil) (2005–2014)
 VH1 HD (2009–2020)
 VH1 MegaHits (2010–2020)
 VH1 (Europe) (1995–2021)
 MTV Live HD (2011–2021)

Offices 
The company has regional offices in:
 Bogotá, Colombia (MTV, Nickelodeon, Comedy Central, Paramount Network)
 Mexico City, Mexico (MTV, Nickelodeon, Comedy Central, Paramount Network, Nick Jr.)
 Buenos Aires, Argentina (MTV, Nickelodeon, Comedy Central, Paramount Network, Telefe, Nick Jr.)
 Santiago, Chile (MTV, Nickelodeon, Comedy Central, Paramount Network, Chilevisión, Nick Jr.)
 São Paulo, Brazil (MTV, Nickelodeon, Comedy Central, Paramount Network, Nick Jr.)
 Toronto, Canada (MTV, MTV2, Nickelodeon and Nick Jr, CMT, Paramount Network, BET and Comedy Central owned by Bell Media with a license from Paramount Global).

Rebranding 
The Brazilian operations of what was then-known as MTVNLA, prior to the rebranding as VIMN The Americas, were called Viacom Networks Brasil, since Abril, the parent company of MTV Brasil, has the exclusive rights to the MTV brand in that country, though, from October 2013, VIMN The Americas reclaimed the MTV brand in Brazil and relaunched the channel, currently a broadcast network, as a cable channel. Viacom International Media Networks The Americas has announced the more localization of content on Nickelodeon for Brazil, and MTV and Nickelodeon channels for Argentina and Mexico.

See also 
 Paramount Global
 MTV
 Paramount Media Networks
 Paramount International Networks

External links 
 MTV Latin America
 MTV Brazil

Americas
American companies established in 1993
Mass media companies established in 1993
1993 establishments in Florida
Companies based in Miami